This is a list of numbered roads in the District Municipality of Muskoka, Ontario. 

Muskoka